This list of books published by Rupert Hart-Davis comprises titles reviewed in The Times Literary Supplement (1947 to 1974), plus reprints in the Mariners Library and Reynard Library series.

Background and history

After serving in the Second World War, Hart-Davis returned to his pre-war occupation as a publisher. In 1946 he founded Rupert Hart-Davis Ltd, in partnership with David Garnett and Edward Young and with financial backing from Eric Linklater, Arthur Ransome, H. E. Bates, Geoffrey Keynes, and Celia and Peter Fleming. His own literary tastes dictated which books were accepted and which rejected. Frequently he turned down commercial successes because he thought little of the works' literary merit. He later said, "I usually found that the sales of the books I published were in inverse ratio to my opinion of them.  That's why I established some sort of reputation without making any money."

When the firm started, paper was rationed; they used Garnett's ex-serviceman's ration, but only one such ration per firm could be used so they could not use that of Hart-Davis. They were given the allocation at cost of a Glasgow bookseller and occasional prewar publisher, Alan Jackson. They decided to start initially with reprints of dead authors, as if a new book became a best-seller they would not have paper for a reprint and the author would leave the firm. They made an exception for Stephen Potter's Gamesmanship which was a short book; they collected every ream of paper they could buy, and printed 25,000 copies. Likewise 25,000 copies of Eric Linklater's Sealskin Trousers (five short stories) were printed.

The firm had best-sellers such as Stephen Potter's Gamesmanship and Heinrich Harrer's Seven Years in Tibet, which sold more than 200,000 copies. Also in the early years Hart-Davis secured Ray Bradbury for his firm, recognising the quality of a science fiction author who also wrote poetry. Other good sellers were Peter Fleming, Eric Linklater and Gerald Durrell; but best-sellers were too few, and though the output of Rupert-Hart-Davis Ltd was regularly praised for the high quality of its printing and binding, that too was an expense that weighed the company down.

When G. M. Young's life of Stanley Baldwin was published in 1952, both Churchill and Beaverbrook threatened to sue if certain passages were not removed or altered. With the help of the lawyer Arnold Goodman an agreement was reached to replace the offending sentences, but they had the "hideously expensive" job of removing and replacing seven leaves from 7,580 copies.

By the middle of the 1950s, Rupert Hart-Davis Ltd could no longer sustain an independent existence and in 1956 it was absorbed into the Heinemann group. Heinemann sold the imprint to the American firm Harcourt Brace in 1961, who sold it to the Granada Group in 1963, when Hart-Davis retired from publishing, though remaining as non-executive chairman until 1968. Publications by the firm after Hart-Davis's retirement are included in the list. Hart-Davis continued to contribute some books to the company's lists after he retired.

The Rupert Hart-Davis Ltd logo was a woodcut of a fox, with a background of oak leaves. The company was based at No. 36 Soho Square, London W1 from 1950, when they moved from 53 Connaught Street. Initially they planned to publish eight books according to their first advertisement in The Bookseller, including Fourteen Stories by Henry James which was dated 1946 but did not actually appear until 14 February 1947. The annual book output according to Hart-Davis was: 1948, 16; 1949, 21; 1950, 25; 1951, 40; 1952, 37; (1953 not given); 1954, 41; 1955, 46; 1956, 45; 1957, 55 then 1962, 60. 

Book series published over the years by Rupert Hart-Davis included the Reynard Library of reprints of works from the great English writers, the Mariners Library of reprints of nautical books, and the Soho Bibliographies started with W. B. Yeats by Allan Wade in 1951.

{| class="wikitable sortable" border="1"
! Year
! Title
!Author
!Editor/illustrator etc.
|-
| 1947
| Fourteen Stories by Henry James
| James, Henry
| Garnett, David (editor)
|-
| 1947
| Democracy and the Arts
| Brooke, Rupert
| Keynes, Geoffrey (preface)
|-
| 1947
| Are These Hardships Necessary?
| Harrod, Roy
|
|-
| 1947
| Sealskin Trousers, and other Stories
| Linklater, Eric
| Hassall, Joan (illustrator)
|-
| 1947
| The Theory and Practice of Gamesmanship; or, The Art of Winning Games without Actually Cheating
| Potter, Stephen
| Wilson, F., Lieutenant-Colonel (illustrator)
|-
| 1948
| The Modern Everyman
| Burn, Michael
|
|-
| 1948
| Henry James and Robert Louis Stevenson: A Record of Friendship and Criticism
| James, Henry,  and Robert Louis Stevenson
| Smith, Janet Adam (editor)
|-
| 1948
| The Firm of Charles Ottley, Landon, and Co
| Carter, John
| Pollard, Graham
|-
| 1948
| Sailing Alone Around the World and Voyage of the Liberdade
| Slocum, Captain Joshua
|The Mariners Library No. 1, Introduction by Arthur Ransome
|-
| 1949
| Two Memoirs: Dr Melchior: A Defeated Enemy, and My Early Beliefs
| Keynes, John Maynard
| Garnett, David (introduction)
|-
| 1949
| The Other House
| James, Henry
| Edel, Leon (introduction)
|-
| 1949
| Praeterita: Outlines of Scenes and Thoughts Perhaps Worthy of Memory in my Past Life
| Ruskin, John
| Clark, Kenneth (introduction)
|-
| 1949
| The Loud Red Patrick
| McKenney, Ruth
|
|-
| 1949
| The Life of William Blake
| Wilson, Mona
|
|-
| 1949
| Blake Studies: Notes on his Life and Works in Seventeen Chapters
| Keynes, Geoffrey
|
|-
| 1949
| Sergeant Shakespeare
| Cooper, Duff
|
|-
| 1949
| The Scenic Art: Notes on Acting and Drama
| James, Henry
| Wade, Allan (editor),  Edel, Leon (foreword)
|-
| 1950
| The Complete Plays
| James, Henry
| Edel, Leon (editor)
|-
| 1950
| Shakespeare's Sonnets Dated, and other Essays
| Hotson, J. Leslie
|
|-
| 1950
| A Stranger on The Stair
| Mortimer, Chapman
|
|-
| 1950
| Elephant Bill
| Lt. Col. J.H. Williams
| Slim, William, Field Marshal (foreword)
|-
| 1950
| Mr Byculla
| Linklater, Eric
|
|-
| 1950
| Sir Philip Sidney
| Wilson, Mona
|
|-
| 1950
| Love Story
| McKenney, Ruth
|
|-
| 1950
| Cricket all his Life: Cricket Writings in Prose and Verse
| Lucas, E. V.
| Hart-Davis, Rupert (editor)
|-
| 1950
| Last Essays
| Young, G. M.
|
|-
| 1950
| Magic City, and other Stories
| Milton, Roderick
|
|-
| 1950
| Goldsmith: Selected Works
| Goldsmith, Oliver
| Garnett, Richard (editor)
|-
| 1950
| Some Notes on Lifemanship
| Potter, Stephen
| Wilson, Frank, Lieutenant-Colonel (illustrator)
|-
| 1950
| Operation Heartbreak
| Cooper, Duff
|
|-
| 1950
| The Dolphin in the Wood
| Bates, Ralph
|
|-
| 1950
| A Generation on Trial
| Cooke, Alistair
|
|-
| 1951
| Call It Treason
| Howe, George
|
|-
| 1951
| Robert Louis Stevenson: Collected Poems
| Stevenson, Robert Louis
| Smith, Janet Adam (editor)
|-
| 1951
| Spaces of the Dark
| Mosley, Nicholas
|
|-
| 1951
| Edmund Blunden: A Selection of his Poetry and Prose
| Blunden, Edmund
| Hopkins, Kenneth (editor)
|-
| 1951
| Sterne
| Sterne, Laurence
| Grant, Douglas (editor)
|-
| 1951
| Father Goose
| Mortimer, Chapman
|
|-
| 1951
| Johnson: Prose and Poetry
| Johnson, Samuel
| Wilson, Mona (editor)
|-
| 1951
| Hilaire Belloc: An Anthology of his Prose and Verse
| Belloc, Hilaire
| Roughead, W. N. (editor)
|-
| 1951
| The Wink
| Bennett, Kem
|
|-
| 1951
| Here's England
| McKenney, Ruth, and Richard Bransten
| Lancaster, Osbert (illustrator)
|-
| 1951
| Mistletoe Malice
| Farrell, Kathleen
|
|-
| 1951
| And So It Goes On: Further Thoughts on Present Mismanagement
| Harrod, R. F.
|
|-
| 1951
| The Sixth Column
| Fleming, Peter
|
|-
| 1951
| Fright in the Forest
| Sowerby, Benn
| Sassoon, Siegfried (introduction)
|-
| 1951
| Ti-Coyo and his Shark
| Richer, Clement
| Hopkins, Gerard (translator)
|-
| 1951
| The Sky is a Lonely Place
| Falstein, Louis
|
|-
| 1951
| A Place to Hide
| King, Clifford
|
|-
| 1951
| A Guide through the District of the Lakes in the North of England
| Wordsworth, William
| Merchant, W. M. (introduction)
|-
| 1951
| The Lightning that Struck Me
| Milton, Roderick
|
|-
| 1951
| The Build-Up Boys
| Kirk, Jeremy
|
|-
| 1951
| The Dog Star
| Windham, Donald
|
|-
| 1951
| The Silver Locusts
| Bradbury, Ray
|
|-
| 1951
| The Crippled Muse
| Wheeler, Hugh
|
|-
| 1951
| The Swan
| Steen, Marguerite
|
|-
| 1951
| Childhood at Oriol
| Burn, Michael
|
|-
| 1951
| The Magic of my Youth
| Calder-Marshall, Arthur
|
|-
| 1951
| End of the Line
| Baron, Stanley Wade
|
|-
| 1951
| Letters from America
| Cooke, Alistair
|
|-
| 1951
| The "Falcon" in the Baltic
| Knight, E. F.
| The Mariners Library No 15, Introduction by Arthur Ransome
|-
| 1952
| A Bibliography of the Writings of W. B. Yeats
| Wade, Allan
|
|-
| 1952
| The Dead Won't Know
| Séchan, Olivier
| Sainsbury, Geoffrey (translator)
|-
| 1952
| Dryden: Poetry, Prose, and Plays
| Dryden, John
| Grant, Douglas (editor)
|-
| 1952
| The Next Million Years
| Darwin, Charles Galton, Sir
|
|-
| 1952
| Into Hades
| Young, Andrew
|
|-
| 1952
| Music at Belmont
| Sheppard, J. T.
|
|-
| 1952
| My Friend Vassia
| Rounault, Jean
| Traill, Vera (translator),  Chapman, Guy (introduction)
|-
| 1952
| Two Shadows Pass
| King, Clifford
|
|-
| 1952
| Harpoon at a Venture
| Maxwell, Gavin
|
|-
| 1952
| Gustave Courbet
| Mack, Gerstle
|
|-
| 1952
| The Life and Voyages of Captain Joshua Slocum
| Slocum, Victor
|
|-
| 1952
| All my Enemies
| Baron, Stanley Wade
|
|-
| 1952
| The Illustrated Man
| Bradbury, Ray
|
|-
| 1952
| Shakespeare's Motley
| Hotson, J. Leslie
|
|-
| 1952
| A. E. Housman: An Annotated Hand-List
| Carter, John, and John Sparrow
|
|-
| 1952
| ABC for Book-Collectors
| Carter, John
|
|-
| 1952
| A Bibliography of the Works of Max Beerbohm
| Gallatin, A. E., and Oliver, L. M
|
|-
| 1952
| One-Upmanship
| Potter, Stephen
|
|-
| 1952
| Voyage in a Barquentine
| Roach, Peter
| Seligman, Adrian (introduction)
|-
| 1952
| The Midnight Diary
| Burn, Michael
|
|-
| 1952
| One of our Submarines
| Young, Edward
|
|-
| 1952
| A Forgotten Journey
| Fleming, Peter
|
|-
| 1952
| Stanley Baldwin
| Young, G. M.
|
|-
| 1952
| The Cruise of the Alerte
| Knight, E. F.
| The Mariners Library No 21, Introduction by Arthur Ransome
|-
| 1953
| The Drunken Boat
| Rimbaud, Arthur
| Hill, Brian (translator)
|-
| 1953
| Macaulay: Prose and Poetry
| Macaulay, Thomas Babbington
| Young, G. M. (editor)
|-
| 1953
| Working with Roosevelt
| Rosenman, Samuel
| Sherwood, Robert E. (preface)
|-
| 1953
| People and Americans
| Baron, Stanley Wade
|
|-
| 1953
| Coleridge
| House, Humphry
|
|-
| 1953
| The Weeping and the Laughter: A Chapter of Autobiography
| MacLaren-Ross, Julian
|
|-
| 1953
| The Book of Cricket Verse: An Anthology
| various
| Brodribb, Gerald (editor)
|-
| 1953
| Around Theatres
| Beerbohm, Max
|
|-
| 1953
| The Power and the Valley
| Billings, Henry
|
|-
| 1953
| Landsman Hay: The Memoirs of Robert Hay, 1789–1847
| Hay, Robert
| Hay, M. D. (editor)
|-
| 1953
| Henry James: The Untried Years, 1843–1870
| Edel, Leon
|
|-
| 1953
| Take It to Heart
| Farrell, Kathleen
|
|-
| 1953
| Norman Douglas
| Dawkins, R. M.
|
|-
| 1953
| The Frozen Flame
| O'Brian, Patrick
|
|-
| 1953
| Bandoola
| Williams, J. H., Colonel
|
|-
| 1953
| The Voyage of Anahita
| Bernicot, Louis, Captain
| Allcard, Edward (translator)
|-
| 1953
| Seven Years in Tibet
| Harrer, Heinrich
| Graves, Richard (translator)
|-
| 1953
| The Golden Apples of the Sun
| Bradbury, Ray
| Peters, Eric (translator)
|-
| 1953
| A Blessed Girl: Memoirs of a Victorian Girlhood
| Lutyens, Lady Emily
|
|-
| 1953
| A Bibliography of James Joyce, 1882–1941
| Slocum, John J.
| Cahoon, Herbert
|-
| 1953
| Old Men Forget: An Autobiography
| Cooper, Duff
|
|-
| 1953
| The March Out
| Shaw, James
|
|-
| 1953
| Poems to Mary
| Burn, Michael
|
|-
| 1953
| Hackenfeller's Ape
| Brophy, Brigid
|
|-
| 1953
| Hunting Scenes from Surtees
| Surtees, Robert
| Gough, Lionel (editor)
|-
| 1953
| Stings and Honey
| Jones, L. E.
|
|-
| 1953
| The Cruise of the Kate
| Middleton, E. E.
| The Mariners Library No 23, Introduction by Arthur Ransome
|-
| 1954
| The Incredible Mizners
| Johnston, Alva
|
|-
| 1954
| Ballads and other Verse
| Mackintosh, H. S.
|
|-
| 1954
| Wood Engravings of Thomas Bewick
| Bewick, Thomas
| Stone, Reynolds (editor)
|-
| 1954
| Tomorrow is Already Here
| Jungk, Robert
| Waldman, M. (translator)
|-
| 1954
| Perdu and his Father
| Rombi, Paride
| Reed, Henry (translator)
|-
| 1954
| Three Singles to Adventure
| Durrell, Gerald
|
|-
| 1954
| Matthew Arnold: Poetry and Prose
| Arnold, Matthew
| Bryson, John (editor)
|-
| 1954
| The Golden Honeycomb
| Cronin, Vincent
|
|-
| 1954
| Fahrenheit 451
| Bradbury, Ray
|
|-
| 1954
| Jubilate Agno
| Smart, Christopher
| Bond, W. H. (editor)
|-
| 1954
| Son of Ti-Coyo
| Richer, Clement
| Hopkins, Gerard (translator)
|-
| 1954
| A Bewilderment of Birds
| Stanford, J. K.
|
|-
| 1954
| A Bibliography of Norman Douglas
| Woolf, Cecil
|
|-
| 1954
| The Dancing Bear
| Faviell, Frances
|
|-
| 1954
| A Tale of Two Brothers: John and Charles Wesley
| Brailsford, Mabel Richmond
|
|-
| 1954
| The Journal of William Beckford in Portugal and Spain, 1787–1788
| Beckford, William
| Alexander, Boyd (editor)
|-
| 1954
| The Cut of the Axe
| Jackson, Delmar
|
|-
| 1954
| A Rogue with Ease
| Argus, M. K.
|
|-
| 1954
| Matthew Arnold: Poetry and Prose
| Arnold, Matthew
| Bryson, John (editor)
|-
| 1954
| Old Men Forget
| Cooper, Duff
|
|-
| 1954
| Two Memoirs
| Keynes, John Maynard
|
|-
| 1954
| A Bibliography of Rupert Brooke
| Keynes, Geoffrey, Dr
|
|-
| 1954
| Edinburgh: Picturesque Notes
| Stevenson, Robert Louis
| Coburn, Mr (illustrator),  Smith, Janet Adam (preface)
|-
| 1954
| Tombolo
| Fersen, Nicholas
|
|-
| 1954
| The Collected Poems of Mary Coleridge
| Coleridge, Mary
| Whistler, Theresa (editor)
|-
| 1954
| The First Night of "Twelfth Night"
| Hotson, J. Leslie
|
|-
| 1954
| The Fragile Chain
| Morecroft, Annie
|
|-
| 1954
| The Wind in the Sails
| Perret, Jacques
|
|-
| 1954
| Caesar's Honour
| Hepburn, Janet
|
|-
| 1954
| The Letters of W. B. Yeats
| Yeats, William Butler
| Wade, Allan (editor)
|-
| 1954
| Prisoners' Bluff
| Magener, Rolf
| Creighton, Basil (translator)
|-
| 1954
| Call to Greatness
| Stevenson, Adlai E.
|
|-
| 1954
| The Bafut Beagles
| Durrell, Gerald
| Thompson, Ralph (illustrator)
|-
| 1954
| A Pinch of Pound Notes
| Dingle, John
|
|-
| 1954
| The Five Seasons
| Eska, Karl
| Kee, Robert (translator)
|-
| 1954
| The Voyage Alone in the Yacht 'Rob Roy| John MacGregor
| The Mariners Library No 24, Introduction by Arthur Ransome
|-
| 1955
| Son of Oscar Wilde
| Holland, Vyvyan
|
|-
| 1955
| Kurun around the World
| Le Toumelin, Jacques-Yves
|
|-
| 1955
| Tibetan Marches
| Migot, André
| Fleming, Peter (translator)
|-
| 1955
| The Last Sortie
| Zand, Herbert
| Woodhouse, C. M. (translator)
|-
| 1955
| The Moving Waters
| Collis, John Stewart
|
|-
| 1955
| Manuela
| Woods, William
|
|-
| 1955
| The Dreyfus Case
| Chapman, Guy
|
|-
| 1955
| The Iron Gate of Illyria
| Sommelius, Torgny
|
|-
| 1955
| The Wise Man From the West
| Cronin, Vincent
|
|-
| 1955
| The Film of Memory
| Druon, Maurice
| Budberg, Moura (translator)
|-
| 1955
| The Nature of Power: Civilization and Foreign Policy
| Halle, Louis J.
|
|-
| 1955
| The Road to Samarcand
| O'Brian, Patrick
|
|-
| 1955
| Mars in Capricorn: An Adventure and an Experience
| Cross, Beverley
|
|-
| 1955
| The Tall Dark Man
| Chamberlain, Anne
|
|-
| 1955
| Mirage in the Arctic
| Mikkelsen, Ejnar
| Michael, Maurice (translator)
|-
| 1955
| Two Thousand Fathoms Down
| Houot, Georges, and Willm, Pierre
| Bullock, Michael (translator),  Cousteau, J-Y. (foreword),  Tailliez, P. (introduction)
|-
| 1955
| Greek Entanglement
| Myers, E. C. W.
|
|-
| 1955
| Leopards in the Night
| Muldoon, Guy
|
|-
| 1955
| The West in My Eyes
| van de Wiele, Annie
| Young, Edward and Young, Diana (translators)
|-
| 1955
| Wordsworth: Poetry and Prose
| Wordworth, William
| Merchant, W. Moelwyn (editor)
|-
| 1955
| Abode of Snow
| Mason, Kenneth
|
|-
| 1955
| Song at the Year's Turning: Poems, 1942–1954
| Thomas, R. S.
| Betjeman, John (introduction)
|-
| 1955
| The River Boy
| Whistler, Theresa
|
|-
| 1955
| The Lost Glacier
| Styles, Showell
|
|-
| 1955
| Hitler's Paper Weapon
| Hottl, Wilhelm
| Creighton, Basil (translator)
|-
| 1955
| All in Due Time
| House, Humphry
| Hough, Graham (editor)
|-
| 1955
| A House of the Rhine
| Faviell, Frances
|
|-
| 1955
| Early Light: Collected Poems
| Wellesley, Dorothy
|
|-
| 1955
| The Buried People: A Study of the Etruscan World
| von Cles-Reden, Sibylle
| Woodhouse, C. M. (translator)
|-
| 1956
| The Best of Friends: Further Letters to Sydney Carlyle Cockerell
| various
| Meynell, Viola (editor)
|-
| 1956
| Carlyle: Selected Works, Reminiscences, and Letters
| Carlyle, Thomas
| Symons, Julian (editor)
|-
| 1956
| Islands of Tomorrow
| Elmberg, John-Erik
| Walford, Naomi (translator)
|-
| 1956
| Spam Tomorrow
| Anderson, Verily
|
|-
| 1956
| In Time of Trouble
| Cockburn, Claud
|
|-
| 1956
| Bach and the Heavenly Choir
| Ruber, Johannes
| Michael, Maurice (translator)
|-
| 1956
| A Most Contagious Game
| Grafton, Samuel
|
|-
| 1956
| The Golden Ocean
| O'Brian, Patrick
|
|-
| 1956
| Lying in the Sun, and other Stories
| O'Brian, Patrick
|
|-
| 1956
| The Iron King
| Druon, Maurice
|
|-
| 1956
| Switch on the Night
| Bradbury, Ray
| Gekiere, Madeline (illustrator)
|-
| 1956
| The Siege of Nanga Parbat, 1856–1953
| Bauer, Paul
| Rickmers, R. W. (translator),  Hunt, Sir John, (Preface)
|-
| 1956
| The Drunken Forest
| Durrell, Gerald
| Thompson, Ralph (illustrator)
|-
| 1956
| The Mermaids
| Boros, Eva
|
|-
| 1956
| What I Think
| Stevenson, Adlai E.
|
|-
| 1956
| The Reluctant Legionnaire: An Escapade
| Alexander, Michael
|
|-
| 1956
| The Lonely South
| Migot, Andre
| Graves, Richard (translator)
|-
| 1956
| The View from this Window
| Whistler, Laurence
|
|-
| 1956
| The October Country
| Bradbury, Ray
|
|-
| 1956
| My Aunt's Rhinoceros
| Fleming, Peter
|
|-
| 1956
| William Nicholson
| Brouse, Lillian
|
|-
| 1956
| The Nightwalkers
| Cross, Beverley
|
|-
| 1956
| G. M.: Memories of George Moore
| Cunard, Nancy
|
|-
| 1956
| Aristotle's Poetics
| House, Humphry
| Hardie, Colin (editor)
|-
| 1956
| Green with Beasts
| Merwin, W. S.
|
|-
| 1956
| The Letters of William Blake
| Blake, William
| Keynes, Geoffrey (editor)
|-
| 1956
| The Silver Kingdom
| Garnett, Richard
| Dickins, Jane (illustrator)
|-
| 1956
| The Strangled Queen
| Druon, Maurice
| Hare, Humphrey (translator)
|-
| 1956
| Books and Book-Collectors
| Carter, John
|
|-
| 1956
| The Soldier Room
| Chamberlain, Anne
|
|-
| 1956
| Potter on America
| Potter, Stephen
|
|-
| 1956
| Nine Bald Men
| Cockburn, Claud
|
|-
| 1956
| My Family and Other Animals
| Durrell, Gerald
|
|-
| 1956
| Pacific Ordeal
| Ainslie, Kenneth
|
|-
| 1957
| The Birth of Rowland
| Lytton, Robert and Elizabeth
| Lutyens, Emily, Lady (editor)
|-
| 1957
| A Bibliography of Frederick Rolfe, Baron Corvo
| Woolf, Cecil
|
|-
| 1957
| Margaret the First
| Grant, Douglas
|
|-
| 1957
| The Last Detachment: The Cadets of Saumer, 1940
| Druon, Maurice
| Hare, Humphrey (translator)
|-
| 1957
| Newman: Prose and Poetry
| Newman, John Henry
| Tillotson, Geoffrey (editor)
|-
| 1957
| All Through the Night
| Vaughan, Richard
|
|-
| 1957
| Life at Fonthill, 1807-1822: From the Correspondence of William Beckford
| Beckford of Fonthill, William
| Alexander, Boyd (editor)
|-
| 1957
| Two against the Ice
| Mikkelsen, Ejnar
| Michael, Maurice (translator)
|-
| 1957
| No Passport to Tibet
| Bailey, F. M.
|
|-
| 1957
| Union Street
| Causley, Charles
|
|-
| 1957
| The Enemy in the Heart
| Jones, T. H.
|
|-
| 1957
| The Last Migration
| Cronin, Vincent
|
|-
| 1957
| Three Hundred and Nine East, and A Night of Levitation
| van Orden, Bianca
|
|-
| 1957
| Invasion 1940: An Account of the German Preparations and the British Counter-Measures
| Fleming, Peter
|
|-
| 1957
| Cape of Storms
| Popham, Hugh
|
|-
| 1957
| The Poisoned Crown
| Druon, Maurice
| Hare, Humphrey (translator)
|-
| 1957
| The Trumpeting Herd
| Muldoon, Guy
| Thompson, Ralph (illustrator)
|-
| 1957
| A Noise in the Night
| Jepson, Selwyn
|
|-
| 1957
| Ark Royal, 1939–1941
| Jameson, William
|
|-
| 1957
| A. E. Housman: A Divided Life
| Watson, George L.
|
|-
| 1957
| The Spotted Deer
| Williams, J. H., Colonel
|
|-
| 1957
| Candles in the Sun
| Lutyens, Emily, Lady
|
|-
| 1957
| Our Square
| Anderson, Verily
|
|-
| 1957
| Letters to Lady Cunard, 1895–1933
| Moore, George
| Hart-Davis, Rupert (editor)
|-
| 1957
| Selected Letters of Henry James
| James, Henry
| Edel, Leon (editor)
|-
| 1957
| The Painter's Eye
| James, Henry
| Sweeney, John L. (editor)
|-
| 1957
| No Earthly Command
| Calder-Marshall, Arthur
|
|-
| 1957
| With the Guards to Mexico!
| Fleming, Peter
|
|-
| 1957
| Dandelion Wine
| Bradbury, Ray
|
|-
| 1957
| New America
| Stevenson, Adlai E., Harris, Seymour E., Martin, John Bartlow, and Schlesinger, Arthur Jr.
|
|-
| 1957
| The Golden Impala
| Ropner, Pamela
|
|-
| 1957
| The Spy's Bedside Book
| various
| Greene, Graham and Greene, Hugh (editors)
|-
| 1957
| Gervasutti's Climbs
| Gervasutti, Giusto
| Morin, Nea E. and Smith, Janet Adam (translator)
|-
| 1957
| A Sociable Plover
| Linklater, Eric
|
|-
| 1957
| The Sea is for Sailing
| Pye, Peter
|
|-
| 1957
| The True Blue
| Alexander, Michael
|
|-
| 1957
| A Bibliography of Virginia Woolf
| Kirkpatrick, B. J.
|
|-
| 1958
| The House of Fiction
| James, Henry
| Edel, Leon (editor)
|-
| 1958
| Doubting Thomas
| Brebner, Winston
|
|-
| 1958
| Georgian Afternoon
| Jones, L. E.
|
|-
| 1958
| – Letters
| James, Henry and Wells, H. G.
| Edel, Leon, and Ray, Gordon N. (editors)
|-
| 1958
| A Bibliography of the Writings of W. B. Yeats (2nd Edition)
| Wade, Allan
|
|-
| 1958
| A Bibliography of Henry James
| Edel, Leon, and Laurence, Dan H.
|
|-
| 1958
| The Royal Succession
| Druon, Maurice
|
|-
| 1958
| The Ride from Hell
| Palmer, Herbert
|
|-
| 1958
| The Man from Devil's Island
| Calder-Marshall, Arthur
|
|-
| 1958
| The Stories of Sean O'Faolain
| O'Faolain, Sean
|
|-
| 1958
| The Rainbow Comes and Goes
| Cooper, Diana
|
|-
| 1958
| Olympia and the Angel
| Cavaliero, Roderigo
|
|-
| 1958
| The Door Marked Malaya
| Crawford, Oliver
|
|-
| 1958
| Brighter than a Thousand Suns: The Moral and Political History of the Atomic Scientists
| Jungk, Robert
| Cleugh, James (translator)
|-
| 1958
| Parisian Sketches
| James, Henry
| Edel, Leon and Dusoir, Ilse (editors)
|-
| 1958
| Water Music
| van Orden, Bianca
|
|-
| 1958
| The Buttercup Children
| Hesketh, Phoebe
|
|-
| 1958
| Two Lakes
| Brebner, Winston
|
|-
| 1958
| Two Gold Rings
| Davies, Margaret
|
|-
| 1958
| Lost Summer
| Davis, Christopher
|
|-
| 1958
| Poetry for Supper
| Thomas, R. S.
|
|-
| 1958
| Cecilia: The Life and Letters of Cecilia Ridley, 1819–1845
| Ridley, Cecilia
| Ridley, Viscountess (editor)
|-
| 1958
| T. S. Eliot: A Symposium for his Seventieth Birthday
| various
| Braybrooke, Neville (editor)
|-
| 1958
| The Gower Street Poltergeist
| Fleming, Peter
|
|-
| 1958
| Pictures in the Fire
| Collier, John
|
|-
| 1958
| In the Cage
| James, Henry
| Zabel, Morton Dauwen (editor)
|-
| 1958
| Monsters and Marlinspikes
| Popham, Hugh
| Oakley, Graham (illustrator)
|-
| 1958
| Tistou of the Green Fingers
| Druon, Maurice
| Hare, Humphrey (translator)
|-
| 1958
| Max's Nineties
| Beerbohm, Max
| Lancaster, Osbert (introduction)
|-
| 1958
| J. B. Priestley
| Hughes, David Y.
|
|-
| 1958
| Andrew Young – Poems
| Young, Andrew
| Clark, Leonard (editor)
|-
| 1958
| Out of the World and Back
| Young, Andrew
|
|-
| 1958
| Sharks are Caught at Night
| Poli, François
| Walford, Naomi (translator)
|-
| 1959
| On the Track of Unknown Animals
| Heuvelmans, Bernard
| Garnett, Richard (translator)
|-
| 1959
| The Sky Above the Roof
| Verlaine, Paul
| Hill, Brian (translator)
|-
| 1959
| The Tangerine
| de Rivoyre, Christine
| Denny, Norman (translator)
|-
| 1959
| Havelock Ellis
| Calder-Marshall, Arthur
|
|-
| 1959
| To Be Young
| Lutyens, Mary
|
|-
| 1959
| The Skylark and other Poems
| Hodgson, Ralph
| Stone, Reynolds (illustrator)
|-
| 1959
| A Pearl to India: The Life of Roberto de Nobili
| Cronin, Vincent
|
|-
| 1959
| Fortune's Fool
| de Nerval, Gerard
| Hill, Brian (translator)
|-
| 1959
| The Day It Rained Forever
| Bradbury, Ray
|
|-
| 1959
| The Guitar
| del Castillo, Michel
| Hare, Humphrey (translator)
|-
| 1959
| The Sacred Fount
| James, Henry
| Edel, Leon (introduction)
|-
| 1959
| The Darkest Bough
| Chamberlain, Anne
|
|-
| 1959
| The Mastepiece and the Man: Yeats As I Knew Him
| Gibbon, Monk
|-
| 1959
| Once is Enough
| Smeeton, Miles
|
|-
| 1959
| The Light of Common Day
| Cooper, Diana, Lady
|
|-
| 1959
| The Siege at Peking
| Fleming, Peter, Colonel
|
|-
| 1959
| Child of the Twenties
| Donaldson, Frances
|
|-
| 1959
| The Unknown Shore
| O'Brian, Patrick
|
|-
| 1959
| Corridor of Honour
| Fersen, Nicholas
|
|-
| 1959
| Whistle the Wind
| Shearwood, Kenneth
|
|-
| 1959
| A Seal Flies
| Pearson, R. H.
|
|-
| 1959
| Big Charlie
| Williams, J. H.
|
|-
| 1959
| Woman's Estate
| Napier, Mary
|
|-
| 1959
| Engraved Glass, 1952–58
| Whistler, Laurence
|
|-
| 1959
| The Face of War
| Gellhorn, Martha
|
|-
| 1959
| Friends and Enemies
| Stevenson, Adlai E.
|
|-
| 1959
| The Lion
| Kessel, Joseph
| Green, Peter (translator)
|-
| 1959
| I Forgot to Tell You
| Jones, L. E.
|
|-
| 1959
| Mother Was Always in Love
| van Rensselaer, Philip
|
|-
| 1959
| Sealed with a Loving Kiss
| Hughes, David
|
|-
| 1959
| Burning Secret
| McDonell, Gordon
|
|-
| 1959
| The Curtain Falls
| Druon, Maurice
| Hare, Humphrey (translator)
|-
| 1959
| Dickens Incognito
| Aylmer, Felix
|
|-
| 1959
| The Fair to Middling
| Calder-Marshall, Arthur
|
|-
| 1959
| The White Spider
| Harrer, Heinrich
| Merrick, Hugh (translator)
|-
| 1959
| Steps to Immaturity: An Autobiography
| Potter, Stephen
|
|-
| 1959
| Scotty
| Davis, Christopher
|
|-
| 1960
| The Owl of Minerva
| Regler, Gustav
|
|-
| 1960
| The Witch
| Hulton, Nika, Lady
|
|-
| 1960
| A Snare for the Heart
| de Rivoyre, Christine
| Hare, Humphrey (translator)
|-
| 1960
| Shakespeare's Wooden O
| Hotson, J. Leslie
|
|-
| 1960
| Watch and Ward
| James, Henry
|
|-
| 1960
| The Living House
| Ordish, George
|
|-
| 1960
| The Hero Continues
| Windham, Donald
|
|-
| 1960
| Sickert
| Browse, Lillian
|
|-
| 1960
| The Answer to Life is No
| anonymous
|
|-
| 1960
| Arnold Bennett and H. G. Wells – Letters
| Bennett, Arnold and Wells, H. G.
| Wilson, Harris (editor)
|-
| 1960
| Alexander the God
| Druon, Maurice
|
|-
| 1960
| Gentlemen Convicts
| Poli, François
| Walford, Naomi (translator)
|-
| 1960
| When We Dead Awaken
| Ibsen, Henrik
| Meyer, Michael (translator)
|-
| 1960
| The Curse of the Misbegotten
| Bowen, Croswell
|
|-
| 1960
| Daughters of Divinity
| Anderson, Verily
|
|-
| 1960
| Songs of a Mad Prince
| Jones, T. H.
|
|-
| 1960
| The Lady from the Sea
| Ibsen, Henrik
| Meyer, Michael (translator)
|-
| 1960
| John Gabriel Borkman
| Ibsen, Henrik
| Meyer, Michael (translator)
|-
| 1960
| Brand
| Ibsen, Henrik
| Meyer, Michael (translator)
|-
| 1960
| The Collected Poems of Andrew Young
| Young, Andrew, Canon
| Clark, Leonard (editor)
|-
| 1960
| The She-Wolf of France
| Druon, Maurice
| Hare, Humphrey (translator)
|-
| 1960
| The Custard Boys
| Rae, John
|
|-
| 1960
| Stanley's Way
| Sterling, Thomas
|
|-
| 1960
| Trumpets from the Steep
| Cooper, Diana, Lady
|
|-
| 1960
| A Zoo in My Luggage
| Durrell, Gerald
|
|-
| 1960
| Tibet Is My Country
| Norbu, Thubten Jigme and Harrer, Heinrich
| Fitzgerald, Edward (translator)
|-
| 1960
| Hired to Kill
| Morris, John
|
|-
| 1960
| The Saving Remnant: An Account of Jewish Survival Since 1914
| Agar, Herbert
|
|-
| 1960
| The Warm Country
| Windham, Donald
|
|-
| 1960
| A Hundred Sonnets
| Turner, Charles Tennyson
|
|-
| 1961
| Lady Lytton's Court Diary, 1895–1899
| Lutyens, Mary (editor)
|
|-
| 1961
| There is a River
| Vaughan, Richard
|
|-
| 1961
| The Death of Tristan
| del Castillo, Michel
| Hare, Humphrey (translator)
|-
| 1961
| Bayonets to Lhasa
| Fleming, Peter, Colonel
|
|-
| 1961
| A Fly-Switch from the Sultan
| Bates, Darrell
|
|-
| 1961
| Gentle Enchanter
| Gautier, Théophile
| Hill, Brian (translator)
|-
| 1961
| The First Five Lives of Annie Besant
| Nethercot, Arthur H.
|
|-
| 1961
| The Bishop's Aunt
| Jones, L. E.
|
|-
| 1961
| How to Become a Musical Critic
| Shaw, George Bernard
| Laurence, Dan H. (editor)
|-
| 1961
| Roderick Hudson
| James, Henry
|
|-
| 1961
| The Scarlet Boy
| Calder-Marshall, Arthur
|
|-
| 1961
| A Sail in a Forest
| Pye, Peter, Dr
|
|-
| 1961
| George Gissing and H. G. Wells
| Gissing, George and  Wells, H. G.
| Gettmann, R. A. (editor)
|-
| 1961
| Shake This Town
| Williams, Robert V.
|
|-
| 1961
| Guy Domville
| James, Henry
| Edel, Leon, (introduction)
|-
| 1961
| Geoffrey Keynes
| Carter, John Waynflete (Contributor)
|
|-
| 1961
| Goodbye to the Bombay Bowler
| Fleming, Peter
|
|-
| 1961
| An Anthology
| Agate, James
| van Thal, Herbert (editor)
|-
| 1961
| A Taste of the Hills
| Smeeton, Miles
|
|-
| 1961
| The Burial
| Lash, Jennifer
|
|-
| 1961
| The Hook: An Eye for an Eye
| Katcha, Vahé
| Torok, Alexander and Hughes, David (translator)
|-
| 1961
| The Shell at My Ear
| Bates, Darrell
|
|-
| 1961
| The Christening Party
| Steegmuller, Francis
|
|-
| 1961
| The Whiston Matter
| Arnold, Ralph
|
|-
| 1961
| The Horsehair Sofa
| Hughes, David
|
|-
| 1961
| The Franco-Prussian War
| Howard, Michael
|
|-
| 1961
| Gondolier
| Marchant, William
|
|-
| 1961
| Mischief among the Penguins
| Tilman, H. W.
|
|-
| 1961
| Roll of Honour
| Linklater, Eric
|
|-
| 1961
| Winter Shoes in Springtime
| Smeeton, Beryl
|
|-
| 1961
| The Whispering Land
| Durrell, Gerald
| Thompson, Ralph (illustrator)
|-
| 1961
| Tares
| Thomas, R. S.
|
|-
| 1961
| Audible Silence
| Whistler, Laurence
|
|-
| 1961
| The Lily and the Lion
| Druon, Maurice
|
|-
| 1961
| Horace Walpole
| Lewis, W. S.
|
|-
| 1961
| The Elusive Monster
| Burton, Maurice, Dr
|
|-
| 1961
| Words in Season
| Brown, Ivor
|
|-
| 1961
| Poor Kit Smart
| Devlin, Christopher
|
|-
| 1962
| East 57th Street
| Jackson, Alan R.
|
|-
| 1962
| Crimson Joy
| Fenn, Charles
|
|-
| 1962
| Platform and Pulpit
| Shaw, George Bernard
| Laurence, Dan H. (editor)
|-
| 1962
| The Pirates of the Brig 'Cyprus'''
| Clune, Frank
| Stephensen, P. R.
|-
| 1962
| A Very Quiet War| Arnold, Ralph
|
|-
| 1962
| Nights in the Gardens of Brooklyn| Swados, Harvey
|
|-
| 1962
| The Matter with Ireland| Shaw, George Bernard
| Greene, David H and Laurence, Dan H (editors)
|-
| 1962
| The Wreathed Head| de Rivoyre, Christine
| O'Brian, Patrick (translator)
|-
| 1962
| I Remember! I Remember!| O'Faolain, Sean
|
|-
| 1962
| The Complete Tales of Henry James (2 vols)| James, Henry
| Edel, Leon (editor)
|
|-
| 1962
| Practise to Deceive| Bradshaw, George
|
|-
| 1962
| Point of Departure| Ingersoll, Ralph
|
|-
| 1962
| The Fleet that Jack Built| Jameson, William, Admiral
|
|-
| 1962
| A Kid Nobody Wants| Kost, Robert
|
|-
| 1962
| Sunk without Trace| Birley, Robert, Dr
|
|-
| 1962
| The Letters of Oscar Wilde| Wilde, Oscar
| Hart-Davis, Rupert (editor)
|-
| 1962
| Conversations with Stalin| Djilas, Milovan
| Petrovich, Michael B. (translator)
|-
| 1962
| Trust in Chariots| Savage, Thomas
|
|-
| 1962
| A Kind of Darkness| Davis, Christopher
|
|-
| 1962
| Trepidation in Downing Street| Jones, L. E.
|
|-
| 1962
| A Bibliography of Siegfried Sassoon| Keynes, Geoffrey, Sir
|
|-
| 1962
| Don't Look Down| Katcha, Vahé
| Hughes, David (translator)
|-
| 1962
| FitzGerald: Selected Works| FitzGerald, Edward
| Richardson, Joanna (editor)
|-
| 1962
| The Poet and the Landscape| Young, Andrew, Canon
|
|-
| 1962
| A Change of Jungles| Smeeton, Miles, Brigadier
|
|-
| 1962
| The Marconi Scandal| Donaldson, Frances
|
|-
| 1962
| Sherlock Holmes| Baring-Gould, William S., and Ketton-Cremer, R. W.
|
|-
| 1962
| The Test: De Gaulle and Algeria| Sulzberger, C. L.
|
|-
| 1962
| Through the Hoop| del Castillo, Michel
| Wiles, Peter (translator)
|-
| 1962
| The Complete Tales of Henry James, vols III and IV| James, Henry
| Edel, Leon (editor)
|-
| 1962
| Henry James: The Conquest of London, 1870–1883| Edel, Leon
|
|-
| 1963
| The Sweeping Wind: A Memoir| de Kruif, Paul
|
|-
| 1963
| A Bibliography of Lucretius| Gordon, Cosmo Alexander
|
|-
| 1963
| A Winter in Nepal| Morris, John
|
|-
| 1963
| The Tunnel under the Channel| Whiteside, Thomas
|
|-
| 1963
| Unity's Children| Sterling, Thomas
|
|-
| 1963
| Something Wicked this Way Comes| Bradbury, Ray
|
|-
| 1963
| The Great Philosophers: The Foundations| Jaspers, Karl
| Arendt, Hannah (editor) and Manheim, Ralph (translator)
|-
| 1963
| The Peace of Christmas Eve| Engelman, Fred L.
|
|-
| 1963
| Orange Street and Brickhole Lane| Arnold, Ralph
|
|-
| 1963
| The Commissioner| Dougherty, Richard
|
|-
| 1963
| Sex, Culture, and Myth| Malinowski, B.
|
|-
| 1963
| The American Establishment| Rovere, Richard H.
|
|-
| 1963
| The Complete Tales of Henry James, vols V and VI| James, Henry
| Edel, Leon (editor)
|-
| 1963
| Henry James: The Middle Years, 1884–1894| Edel, Leon
|
|-
| 1963
| Human Conduct: An introduction to the Problems of Ethics| Hospers, John
|
|-
| 1963
| A Seraph in a Box| Willson, Robina Beckles
| Ambrus, Victor G. (illustrator)
|-
| 1963
| Lady Jane| Jamison, C. V.
| Jacques, Robin (illustrator)
|-
| 1963
| A is for Anything| Barry, Katharina
|
|-
| 1963
| A Bibliography of Ronald Firbank| Benkovitz, Miriam J.
|
|-
| 1963
| The Doors of Stone: Poems, 1938–1962| Prince, F. T.
|
|-
| 1963
| The Fate of Admiral Kolchak| Fleming, Peter
|
|-
| 1963
| Nubian Twilight| Keating, Rex
|
|-
| 1963
| Men and Nations: A World History| Mazour, Anatole G.
| Peoples, John M.
|-
| 1963
| A Bibliography of D. H. Lawrence| Roberts, Warren
|
|-
| 1963
| The Beast at the Door| Jones, T. H.
|
|-
| 1963
| The Complete Tales of Henry James (2 vols)| James, Henry
| Edel, Leon (editor)
|-
| 1963
| The Liberation of Paris| Thornton, Willis
|
|-
| 1963
| The Last Four Lives of Annie Besant| Nethercot, Arthur H.
|
|-
| 1963
| Bemba| Clair, Andrée
| Ponsot, Marie (translator); Johnson, Harper (illustrator)
|-
| 1963
| The Tinsel November| Rhys, Julia
| Barker, Carol (illustrator)
|-
| 1963
| The Mystery of Green Hill| Kusan, Ivan
| Petrovich, Michael B. (translator); Adler, Kermit (illustrator)
|-
| 1963
| The White Dragon| Garnett, Richard
| Oakley, Graham (illustrator)
|-
| 1963
| Summer in Ville-Marie| Daveluy, Paule
|
|-
| 1964
| Hamlet's Divinity, and other Essays| Devlin, Christopher
| Wedgwood, C. V. (introduction)
|-
| 1964
| A Bibliography of Ezra Pound| Gallup, Donald
|
|-
| 1964
| A Longing for Quails| Bates, Darrell
|
|-
| 1964
| The Bread of Truth| Thomas, R. S.
|
|-
| 1964
| The Memoirs of Zeus| Druon, Maurice
| Hare, Humphrey (translator)
|-
| 1964
| The Initials in the Heart| Whistler, Laurence
|
|-
| 1964
| The General| Hulton, Nika, Lady
|
|-
| 1964
| The Forest and the Bulldozer| Stubbs, Joanna
|
|-
| 1964
| Pineapple Palace| Willson, Robina Beckles
| Ambrus, Victor G. (illustrator)
|-
| 1964
| When the Earth Trembles| Tazieff, Haroun
| O'Brian, Patrick (translator)
|-
| 1964
| Apollinaire: Poet among the Painters| Steegmuller, Francis
|
|-
| 1964
| Mr W. H.| Hotson, J. Leslie
|
|-
| 1964
| Scarlet Lancer| Lunt, James, Brigadier
|
|-
| 1964
| The Drood Case| Aylmer, Felix
|
|-
| 1964
| Letters to Reggie Turner| Beerbohm, Max
| Hart-Davis, Rupert (editor)
|-
| 1964
| Europe in Renaissance and Reformation| Thomson, S. Harrison
|
|-
| 1964
| I Come from the Stone Age| Harrer, Heinrich
| Fitzgerald, Edward (translator)
|-
| 1964
| A Bibliography of the Foulis Press| Gaskell, Philip
|
|-
| 1965
| The Odes of Horace| Horatius Flaccus, Quintus
| Michie, James (translator)
|-
| 1965
| On the Heights| Bonatti, Walter
| Edwards, Lovett Fielding (translator)
|-
| 1965
| The Will| Swados, Harvey
|
|-
| 1965
| Vive Moi! An Autobiography| O'Faolain, Sean
|
|-
| 1965
| The Inner Room| Randal, Vera
|
|-
| 1965
| Short Stories since 1930| various
| Morris, John I. (editor)
|-
| 1965
| A Man of Push and Go| Crow, Duncan
|
|-
| 1965
| The Journey and the Pity| Mayewski, Pawel
|
|-
| 1965
| The Devilish Plot| Hall, Aylmer
| Holder, John (illustrator)
|-
| 1965
| The House of the Bittern| Ropner, Pamela
| Williams, K. M. (illustrator)
|-
| 1965
| Eight Cousins| Alcott, Louisa
| Shackell, Rodney (illustrator)
|-
| 1965
| Tigers in the Cellar| Fenner, Carol
|
|-
| 1965
| The Diary of Alice James| James, Alice
| Edel, Leon (editor)
|-
| 1965
| A Bibliography of E. M. Forster| Kirkpatrick, B. J.
|
|-
| 1965
| Doings and Undoings: The Fifties and After in American Writing| Podhoretz, Norman
|
|-
| 1965
| A Girl at Eton| Heygate, Elizabeth
|
|-
| 1965
| John Buchan| Smith, Janet Adam
|
|-
| 1965
| The Pakistani Agent| Robinson, Philip Bedford
|
|-
| 1965
| The Garret| Crawford, Oliver
|
|-
| 1965
| Love and Marriage| Ashford, Daisy, and Angela Ashford
| Steadman, Ralph (illustrator)
|-
| 1965
| A Discreet Immortality| Smith, John
|
|-
| 1965
| Mark Gertler: Selected Letters| Gertler, Mark
| Carrington, Noel (editor)
|-
| 1965
| The Cloud Forest| North, Joan
| Everest, Carol (illustrator)
|-
| 1965
| Anchors Wharf| Willson, Robina Beckles
| Floyd, Gareth (illustrator)
|-
| 1965
| In Place of Katia| Kay, Mara
| Ambrus, Victor G. (illustrator)
|-
| 1965
| The Far-Off Land| Caudill, Rebecca
|
|-
| 1965
| Westminster School| Carleton, John D.
|
|-
| 1966
| Bayonets at St Cloud: The Story of the 18th Brumaire| Goodspeed, D. J., Major
|
|-
| 1966
| Calabrian Summer| Gunnell, Bryn
|
|-
| 1966
| Youth in New Society| Winnicott, D. W. and others
| Raison, Timothy (editor)
|-
| 1966
| Victim of Duty: A Study of James Forrestal| Rogow, Arnold A.
|
|-
| 1966
| Castle Blair| Shaw, Flora
| Everest, Carol (illustrator)
|-
| 1966
| Jazz Country| Hentoff, Nat
|
|-
| 1966
| The Year Round| Clark, Leonard
| Ardizzone, Edward (illustrator)
|-
| 1966
| Wild Swans at Suvanto| Jenkins, Alan
| Frankenberg, Robert (illustrator)
|-
| 1966
| Out of Hiding| Weatherby, W. J.
|
|-
| 1966
| A Story for Teddy and others| Swados, Harvey
|
|-
| 1966
| Colossus| Jones, D. F.
|
|-
| 1966
| A Bibliography of Edmund Burke| Todd, William B.
|
|-
| 1966
| Pieta| Thomas, R. S.
|
|-
| 1966
| The Invisibles| Huxley, Francis
|
|-
| 1966
| ABC for Book-collectors| Carter, John
|
|-
| 1966
| Theresa: The Story of the Yelverton Case| Crow, Duncan
|
|-
| 1966
| The Guardian Angel| Ropner, Pamela
| Bewley, Sheila (illustrator)
|-
| 1966
| The Burning Candle| Kay, Mara
| Carey, Penny (illustrator)
|-
| 1966
| Jack of Dover| Garnett, Richard
| Oakley, Graham (illustrator)
|-
| 1966
| Ten from Tomorrow| Tubb, E. C.
|
|-
| 1966
| The Furies| Roberts, Keith
|
|-
| 1966
| The Heat of the Sun| O'Faolain, Sean
|
|-
| 1966
| Prayer For Sun| Hesketh, Phoebe
|
|-
| 1966
| Ludendorff: Soldier, Dictator, Revolutionary| Goodspeed, D. J.
|
|-
| 1967
| Rossetti and the Pre-Raphaelite Brotherhood, vol I| Fleming, G. H.,
|
|-
| 1967
| Woman of Violence| Cohen, Geula
| Halkin, Hilliel (translator)
|-
| 1967
| Manchester| Sanders, John
| Floyd, Gareth (illustrator)
|-
| 1967
| Ballantyne the Brave| Quayle, Eric
|
|-
| 1967
| The Carpenter Years| Cohen, Arthur A.
|
|-
| 1967
| A Massacre of Innocents| Brennan, Christopher
|
|-
| 1967
| The Wandering Jew and other Stories| Apollinaire, Guillaume
| Hall, Remy Inglis (translator); Little, Anthony (illustrator)
|-
| 1967
| Death is a Dream| Tubb, E. C.
|
|-
| 1967
| The New Poly-Olbion| Young, Andrew, Canon
|
|-
| 1967
| To Celebrate Her Living| Whistler, Laurence
|
|-
| 1967
| Senator Fulbright| Coffin, Tristram
|
|-
| 1967
| The First Summer| Crow, Duncan
|
|-
| 1967
| Moss on the North Side| Wilkinson, Sylvia
|
|-
| 1967
| The Great Philosophers, vol II| Jaspers, Karl   Arendt, Hannah (editor)
| Manheim, Ralph (translator)
|-
| 1967
| The Pacifist Conscience| Mayer, Peter (editor)
|
|-
| 1967
| O Canada| Wilson, Edmund
|
|-
| 1967
| Implosion| Jones, D. F.
|
|-
| 1967
| The Moving Target| Merwin, W. S.
|
|-
| 1967
| Black Light| Kinnell, Galway
|
|-
| 1967
| The Successors| Irving, Laurence
|
|-
| 1967
| The Bratsk Station, and other Poems| Yevtushenko, Yevgeny
| Tupikina-Glaessner, Tina, and Dutton, Geoffrey (translators)
|-
| 1967
| Europe Without Baedeker| Wilson, Edmund
|
|-
| 1968
| The Night's Prison| Morgan, Robert
|
|-
| 1968
| The Dying Stallion, and other Stories| Urquhart, Fred
|
|-
| 1968
| The Dream Master| Zelazny, Roger
|
|-
| 1968
| Gath| Tubb, E. C.
|
|-
| 1968
| Tiriel| Blake, William
| Bentley, Gerald Eades (editor)
|-
| 1968
| Songs of Innocence and Experience| Blake, William
| Keynes, Geoffrey, Sir (editor)
|-
| 1968
| Ezra Pound| Reck, Michael
|
|-
| 1968
| Henrik Ibsen: The Making of a Dramatist, 1828–1864| Meyer, Michael
|
|-
| 1968
| Youth and Age| Turgenev, Ivan Sergeievich
| Mainwaring, Marion (translator)
|-
| 1968
| Sea-Green Magic| Beresford, Elisabeth
| Tout, Ann (illustrator)
|-
| 1968
| The Gangster Girl| Campert, Remco
| Scott, John (translator)
|-
| 1968
| S is for Space| Bradbury, Ray
|
|-
| 1968
| R is for Rocket| Bradbury, Ray
|
|-
| 1968
| E. M. Forster| Brander, Laurence
|
|-
| 1968
| A Radical at Large: American Essays| Swados, Harvey
|
|-
| 1968
| William James| Allen, Gay Wilson
|
|-
| 1968
| Making It| Podhoretz, Norman
|
|-
| 1968
| The Commentary Reader| Podhoretz, Norman (editor)
|
|-
| 1968
| A Summer's Reckoning| Roche, Lise
|
|-
| 1968
| FitzRoy of the Beagle| Mellersh, H. E. L.
|
|-
| 1968
| Sofka| Skipwith, Sofka
|
|-
| 1968
| How to Make Enemies| Duncan, Ronald
|
|-
| 1968
| The Sea, Ships, and Sailors| Cole, William (editor)
|
|-
| 1969
| The Lilywhite Boys| Poole, Josephine
|
|-
| 1968
| Not That he Brought Flowers| Thomas, R. S.
|
|-
| 1968
| Dinner Is Served: A History of Dining in England, 1400–1900| Brett, Gerard
|
|-
| 1969
| The Lost Theatres of London| Mander, Raymond, and Mitchenson, Joe
|
|-
| 1969
| Poetry and Prose| Cowper, William
| Spiller, Brian (editor)
|-
| 1969
| The Poet Assassinated| Apollinaire, Guillaume
| Padgett, Ron (translator); Dine, Jim (illustrator)
|-
| 1969
| The Lure of the Limerick| Baring-Gould, William S.
|
|-
| 1969
| The Ruin of Sir Walter Scott| Quayle, Eric
|
|-
| 1969
| The American Scene| James, Henry
| Edel, Leon (editor)
|-
| 1969
| The Letters of William Blake| Blake, William
| Keynes, Geoffrey, Sir (editor)
|-
| 1969
| The Marvellous Chance| Edwards, Francis
|
|-
| 1969
| In the Wake of the Sea-Serpents| Heuvelmans, Bernard
| Garnett, Richard (translator)
|-
| 1969
| Echo Round His Bones| Disch, Thomas M.
|
|-
| 1969
| The Lice| Merwin, W. S.
|
|-
| 1969
| Over the Alps| Anderson, Patrick
|
|-
| 1969
| Bernardo O'Higgins and the Independence of Chile| Clissold, Stephen
|
|-
| 1969
| The Four-Gated City| Lessing, Doris
|
|-
| 1969
| Desperate Breakaway| Pope, Ray
| Floyd, Gareth (illustrator)
|-
| 1969
| The Gold Dog| de Roo, Anne
|
|-
| 1969
| A Bibliography of Ezra Pound| Gallup, Donald
|
|-
| 1969
| The Bloodybacks| Hargreaves, Reginald, Major
|
|-
| 1969
| A Wreath for Garibaldi| Garrett, George
|
|-
| 1969
| The Turning Sky| Tremayne, Sydney
|
|-
| 1969
| Curzon in India, vol I: Achievement| Dilks, David
|
|-
| 1969
| The Perfect Mistress| Duncan, Ronald
|
|-
| 1969
| The Fool's Heart| Roche, Lise
|
|-
| 1969
| The Time Dweller| Moorcock, Michael
|
|-
| 1969
| More Theatres: 1898–1903| Beerbohm, Max
|
|-
| 1969
| Henry James: The Treacherous Years, 1895-1901| Edel, Leon, Dr
|
|-
| 1969
| The Poems of Catullus| Catullus
| Michie, James (translator); Rowland, Robert (introduction)
|-
| 1969
| Guy Fawkes: The Real Story of the Gunpowder Plot?| Hill, R. H. (Reginald Harrison Hill) (Contributor)
|
|-
| 1969
| Alibi for a Corpse| Lemarchand, Elizabeth
|
|-
| 1969
| Too Quick Despairer| Williams, David Ffrangcon
|
|-
| 1970
| Curzon in India, vol II: Frustration| Dilks, David, Dr
|
|-
| 1970
| The Fifty Days| Duhamel, Jean
| Hall, R. A. (translator)
|-
| 1970
| Done this Day: The European Idea in Action| Crawford, Oliver
|
|-
| 1970
| The Universal Baseball Association Inc., J. Henry Waugh, Prop.| Coover, Robert
|
|-
| 1970
| Fat City| Gardner, Leonard
|
|-
| 1970
| The God of the Labyrinth| Wilson, Colin
|
|-
| 1970
| The Inner Wheel| Roberts, Keith
|
|-
| 1970
| In the Prison of her Skin| Leduc, Violette
| Coltman, Derek (translator)
|-
| 1970
| Man's Dominion| Caver, Mavis
|
|-
| 1970
| One Morning in the War| Hammer, Richard
|
|-
| 1970
| Papillon| Charrière, Henri
| O'Brian, Patrick (translator)
|-
| 1970
| Freud: Founder of Psycho-Analysis| McGlashan, A. M. and Reeve, C. J.
|
|-
| 1970
| Aldous Huxley: A Critical Study| Brander, Laurence
|
|-
| 1970
| Last Theatres| Beerbohm, Max
| Hart-Davis, Rupert (editor)
|-
| 1970
| Captains Without Eyes| Kirkpatrick, Lyman B. Jr
|
|-
| 1970
| The Long Sonata of The Dead| Robinson, Michael F.
|
|-
| 1971
| The Converts| Torres, Tereska
|
|-
| 1971
| Sexual Politics| Millett, Kate
|
|-
| 1971
| Collected Poems| Stevenson, Robert Louis
| Smith, Janet Adam (editor)
|-
| 1971
| Death on Doomsday| Lemarchand, Elizabeth
|
|-
| 1971
| Roman Trier and the Treveri| Wightman, Edith Mary
|
|-
| 1971
| Xavier| Heslop, Richard and Taylor, Bob
|
|-
| 1971
| Love| Carter, Angela
|
|-
| 1971
| The Oppenheimer Case: Security on Trial| Stern, Philip M. and  Green, Harold P.
|
|-
| 1971
| Wolves in the City: The Death of French Algeria| Henissart, Paul
|
|-
| 1971
| Gibraltar: The History of a Fortress| Bradford, Ernle
|
|-
| 1971
| Henrik Ibsen, vol II: The Farewell to Poetry| Meyer, Michael
|
|-
| 1971
| Henrik Ibsen, vol III: The Top of a Cold Mountain| Meyer, Michael
|
|-
| 1971
| Thomas Mann| Hollingdale, R. J.
|
|-
| 1971
| Clancy| Mullally, Frederic
|
|-
| 1971
| Education in Evolution: Church, State, Society and Popular Education, 1800–1870| Hurt, John
|
|-
| 1971
| Latin America: From Conquest to Independence| Fisher, John R.
| Judge, Colin (maps)
|-
| 1971
| The Letters of A.E. Housman| Housman, A. E.
| Maas, Henry (editor)
|-
| 1971
| Stalin: The History of a Dictator| Hyde, H. Montgomery
|
|-
| 1972
| Mozart's Concerto Form| Forman, Denis
|
|-
| 1972
| A History of Mexico| Cheetham, Nicolas, Sir
|
|-
| 1972
| Peace for Our Time| Parkinson, Roger
|
|-
| 1972
| The Earth and Its Satellite| various
| Guest, John (editor)
|
|-
| 1972
| English Poetry, 1900–1950| Sisson, C. H.
|
|-
| 1972
| The Surrogate| Catling, Patrick Skene
|
|-
| 1972
| The Infernal Desire Machines of Doctor Hoffman| Carter, Angela
|
|-
| 1972
| Operation Portland| Houghton, Harry
|
|-
| 1972
| Disease and History| Cartwright, Frederick F., and Biddiss, Michael D.
|
|-
| 1972
| ABC for Book Collectors| Carter, John
|
|-
| 1972
| Henry James: The Master, 1901–1916| Edel, Leon
|
|-
| 1972
| Arms and Armour, 1660–1918| Shepperd, G. A.
|
|-
| 1972
| The Warsaw Uprising: 1 August–2 October 1944| Bruce, George
|
|-
| 1972
| Bonnie Prince Charlie| McLaren, Moray
|
|-
| 1972
| The General Strike| Farman, Christopher
|
|-
| 1972
| Franco's Prisoner| Garcia, Miguel
|
|-
| 1972
| The Oil Barons: Men of Greed and Grandeur| O'Connor, Richard
|
|-
| 1972
| Order of Assassins: The Psychology of Murder| Wilson, Colin
|
|-
| 1973
| Murderous Providence| Rothman, Harry
|
|-
| 1973
| Blood, Toil, Tears and Sweat: The War History from Dunkirk to Alamein, Based on the War Cabinet Papers of 1940–1942| Parkinson, Roger
|
|-
| 1973
| The Ice Age| Kurten, Bjorn
|
|-
| 1973
| Journals of Resistance| Theodorakis, Mikis
| Webb, Graham (translator)
|-
| 1973
| Memoirs of an Ex-Prom Queen| Shulman, Alix Kates
|
|-
| 1973
| The Epigrams of Martial| Martial
| Michie, James (translator and editor)
|-
| 1973
| Albert Einstein: Creator and Rebel| Hoffmann, Banesh
| Dukas, Helen
|-
| 1973
| The Battleship Era| Padfield, Peter
|
|-
| 1973
| The Devil Tree| Kosinski, Jerzy
|
|-
| 1973
| Rambling Rose| Willingham, Calder
|
|-
| 1973
| The Peninsular War| Parkinson, Roger
|
|-
| 1973
| The Seven Years War| Furneaux, Rupert
|
|-
| 1973
| The Man in the Middle| Atkinson, Hugh
|
|-
| 1973
| Banco: The Further Advancement of Papillon| Charrière, Henri
| O'Brian, Patrick (translator)
|-
| 1973
| Three Popes and A Cardinal| Martin, Malachi
|
|-
| 1973
| Kiss Me Goodnight, Sergeant-Major| Page, Martin (editor)
| Tidy, Bill (illustrator)
|-
| 1973
| Baldwin: The Unexpected Prime Minister| Hyde, H. Montgomery
|
|-
| 1974
| The Conquest of Cancer| Wilkinson, James
|
|-
| 1974
| The Colonial Revolution| Brockway, A. Fenner
|
|-
| 1974
| Stories and Plays| O'Brien, Flann
|
|-
| 1974
| Lord Esher| Fraser, Peter
|
|-
| 1974
| Getting into Death| Disch, Thomas M.
|
|-
| 1974
| Out of the Garden| MacInnes, Colin
|
|-
| 1974
| Selected Poems, 1946–1968| Thomas, R. S.
|
|-
| 1974
| The Assassination of Heydrich| Ivanov, Miroslav
| O'Brian, Patrick (translator)
|-
| 1974
| Earth's Voyage through Time| Dineley, David
|
|-
| 1974
| Organized Knowledge: A Sociological View of Science and Technology| Sklair, Leslie
|
|-
| 1974
| The Clockwork Testament, or Enderby's End| Burgess, Anthony
|
|-
| 1974
| A Day's March Nearer Home: The War History from Alamein to VE Day Based on War Cabinet Papers of 1942–1945| Parkinson, Roger
|
|-
| 1974
| The Schoolgirl Murder Case| Wilson, Colin
|
|-
| 1974
| Hazard| Browne, Gerald A.
|
|-
| 1974
| Crack-Up| Atkinson, Hugh
|
|-
| 1974
| The Best American Short Stories12| Foley, Martha (editor)
|
|-
| 1974
| Man and Beast| Willis, Roy
| Douglas, Mary (editor)
|-
| 1974
| Jessie Matthews: a Biography| Thornton, Michael
|
|-
| 1974
| The Formation of England, 550–1042| Finberg, H. P. R.
|
|-
| 1974
| The Great Naval Race: The Anglo-German Naval Rivalry, 1900–1914| Padfield, Peter
|
|-
| 1974
| Hitler's Rise to Power: The Nazi Movement in Bavaria, 1923–1933| Pridham, Geoffrey
|
|-
| 1974
| The Great British Picture Show| Perry, George
|
|-
| 1974
| Let's Go Play at The Adams
| Johnson, Mendal W.
|
|}

Notes

References
Ziegler, Philip: Rupert Hart-Davis, Man of Letters'', Chatto and Windus, London, 2004.  

Hart-Davis, Rupert